Brad Evans may refer to:
 Brad Evans (soccer), American soccer player
 Brad Evans (author) (born 1974), political philosopher, critical theorist and writer
 Brad Evans (cricketer) (born 1997), Zimbabwean cricketer
 Brad Evans (cyclist) (born 1992), New Zealand cyclist